A system identifier is a document-processing construct introduced in the HyTime markup language as a supplement to SGML. It was subsequently incorporated into the HTML and XML markup languages.

In HyTime, there are two kinds of system identifier: formal system identifier (FSI) and simple system identifier.

In HTML and XML, a system identifier is a fragmentless URI reference. It typically occurs in a Document Type Declaration. In this context, it is intended to identify a document type which is used exclusively in one application, whereas a public identifier identifies a document type that may span more than one application.

In the following example, the system identifier is the text contained within quotes:

<!DOCTYPE html SYSTEM "http://www.w3.org/TR/xhtml1/DTD/xhtml1-transitional.dtd">

External links
 Description of the system identifier in the context of the Extensible Markup Language (XML) 1.0 (Fifth Edition) on W3.org

Markup languages
Computing terminology